North Judson is a town in Wayne Township, Starke County, in the U.S. state of Indiana. The population was 1,857 as of the 2020 census.

History
The area now known as North Judson was originally Brantwood, a town platted on October 1, 1859, less than a mile northwest of the current town. The town post office was established on September 24, 1860, as North Judson after William D. Judson, President of the Cincinnati & Chicago Railroad (later a part of the Pittsburgh, Cincinnati, Chicago and St. Louis Railroad), which had just been laid through the town. The 'North' was likely added to eliminate confusion with downstate Judson, Indiana.

The town of North Judson proper was later laid out in 1866 and incorporated in 1888.  In 1881, the Indiana, Illinois and Iowa Railroad and Chicago and Atlantic Railroad were each laid through the town. The town formerly owned and remains the headquarters of the Chesapeake & Indiana Railroad.

Geography
North Judson is located at the intersection of State Road 10 and State Road 39 ( (41.217078, −86.775930)).

Demographics

2020 census 
As of the census  of 2020, there were 1,857 people.

2010 census
As of the census of 2010, there were 1,772 people, 706 households, and 456 families residing in the town. The racial makeup of the town was 96.7% White, 0.1% African American, 0.3% Native American, 0.2% Asian, 1.2% from other races, and 1.5% from two or more races. Hispanic or Latino of any race were 7.3% of the population.

There were 706 households, of which 32.3% had children under the age of 18 living with them, 43.5% were married couples living together, 14.9% had a female householder with no husband present, 6.2% had a male householder with no wife present, and 35.4% were non-families. 30.6% of all households were made up of individuals, and 14.7% had someone living alone who was 65 years of age or older. The average household size was 2.51 and the average family size was 3.11.

The median age in the town was 37.7 years. 27% of residents were under the age of 18; 8.3% were between the ages of 18 and 24; 24.5% were from 25 to 44; 24.7% were from 45 to 64; and 15.5% were 65 years of age or older. The gender makeup of the town was 48.0% male and 52.0% female.

2000 census
As of the census of 2000, there were 1,675 people, 648 households, and 425 families residing in the town. The racial makeup of the town was 97.01% White, 0.06% African American, 0.12% Native American, 0.06% Asian, 1.97% from other races, and 0.78% from two or more races. Hispanic or Latino of any race were 6.39% of the population.

There were 648 households, out of which 34.7% had children under the age of 18 living with them, 49.7% were married couples living together, 12.3% had a female householder with no husband present, and 34.4% were non-families. 31.5% of all households were made up of individuals, and 15.9% had someone living alone who was 65 years of age or older. The average household size was 2.58 and the average family size was 3.27.

In the town, the population was spread out, with 31.1% under the age of 18, 8.1% from 18 to 24, 29.0% from 25 to 44, 16.2% from 45 to 64, and 15.6% who were 65 years of age or older. The median age was 33 years. For every 100 females, there were 85.7 males. For every 100 females age 18 and over, there were 86.4 males.

The median income for a household in the town was $29,779, and the median income for a family was $39,792. Males had a median income of $31,071 versus $21,467 for females. The per capita income for the town was $13,052. About 10.5% of families and 12.7% of the population were below the poverty line, including 12.3% of those under age 18 and 15.2% of those age 65 or over.

Education

Library 
The town has a lending library, the North Judson-Wayne Township Library.

Public Education 
The town has an elementary school that teaches kindergarten through sixth grade, while North Judson-San Pierre High School teaches seventh grade through twelfth grade.

Arts and culture
The town hosts the annual Mint Festival over Father's Day weekend in celebration of the history of mint farming in the area.  Musicians perform live throughout the weekend on a stage at Norwayne Field, a Works Progress Administration-built park situated north at the intersection of SRs 10 and 39. Additionally, North Judson is home to the Hoosier Valley Railroad Museum, a memorial to American railroad culture that offers old-fashioned train rides on Saturdays. A short train ride reaches English Lake, at the Kankakee and Yellow Rivers' confluence, before returning to the museum.

Ten miles to the east, Bass Lake, a popular resort, offers summer relaxation opportunities to visitors and locals alike. Just south of the lake, the Melody Drive-in shows movies on two screens.

The community of North Judson is also a strong supporter of its high school North Judson-San Pierre, and the athletic teams the Blue Jays, particularly in football, and basketball, both boys and girls. The Blue Jays have a longtime football rivalry with the Knox High School Redskins, and games are among the biggest high school sports events each season.

Notable people
 David Haugh, sports columnist of the Chicago Tribune
 Henry F. Schricker, 36th and 38th Governor of Indiana
 Christine Barger, comedian and ventriloquist

Notes

Towns in Starke County, Indiana
Towns in Indiana
Northwest Indiana